Crest Ridge R-VII School District was formed in 1979 and originally named the Johnson County R-VII School District.

Area 

The school district encompasses  in North Central Johnson County, Missouri. The school district includes residents from the small towns of Centerview, Columbus and Fayetteville. The school district operates one elementary school, one middle school and one high school.  All of which are now located at the intersection of US Highway 50 and Route 58.

History 

The Johnson County R-VII School District was formed in 1979 after the Johnson County Board of Education submitted a plan of reorganization to the State Board of Education for their review. At the urging of the Farmers and Centerview Boards of Education, a proposal was placed on the February, 1979 ballot and approved. Thus forming the Johnson County R-VII.

The school's mascot is the Cougar and the colors are green and white (but are sometimes green and gold are used because of the agriculture background and John Deere).

References 

 School's Website

School districts in Missouri
Education in Johnson County, Missouri
1979 establishments in Missouri
School districts established in 1979